Nairātmyā or Dagmema is a female buddha, the consort of Hevajra in the Hevajra-tantra. The name means "ego-less woman".

References

See also
Nairatmya - Concept in Buddhism
Sitatapatra
Narodakini
Saraswati
Queen Maya
Hariti
Yakshini
Prithvi
Vajrayogini
Tara (Buddhism)

Buddhas
Dakinis
Female buddhas and supernatural beings

te:నైరాత్మ్యా